Hachette Filipacchi Médias, S.A. (HFM) is a magazine publisher. It is a wholly owned subsidiary of Lagardère Active, a division of the media conglomerate Lagardère Group of France.

History 
Hachette was founded by Louis Hachette (French pronunciation: [a.ʃɛt]) Brédifin 1826 when he purchased the Librairie Brédif; the company later became L. Hachette et Compagnie.

Hachette was purchased by Matra in 1980, a firm associated with Ténot & Filipacchi. Hachette Filipacchi was nationalised in 1981 but remained a publicly traded firm.  It is a subsidiary of Lagardère Media, acquired in 2004.

Publications 
Hachette Filipacchi Media publishes Parents, Paris Match,  and Le Journal du Dimanche. 

From 1985 the company also publishes various titles abroad. Hachette sold its international titles to Hearst in 2011.

References

Further reading
Madjar, Robert (1997).  Daniel Filipacchi.  Editions Michel Lafon

External links
 

Lagardère Active
Magazine publishing companies of France
Publishing companies established in 1826
1826 establishments in France
Disney comics publishers